The British Central Africa Gazette was the government gazette of the British Central Africa Protectorate.

The Gazette was published monthly at Milia between 1894 and September 1907 in English. Copies may be found in the collections of the British Library and the Library of Congress. It was replaced by the Nyasaland government gazette in October 1907.

See also
List of British colonial gazettes

References

British colonial gazettes
Publications established in 1897
British Central Africa Protectorate
1894 establishments in the British Empire